Ihor Luchkevych (born 19 November 1973) is a Ukrainian retired professional football midfielder and current assistant manager at Mynai.

Career
After retiring from playing career he worked in the structure of FC Metalurh Zaporizhzhia.  From December 2013 he is working as assistant coach to the Ukrainian First League club FC Poltava after invitation to this position by Illya Blyznyuk.

Personal life
His son Valeriy Luchkevych is also a professional footballer.

References

External links
 
 

1973 births
Living people
Ukrainian footballers
Ukraine international footballers
Ukraine under-21 international footballers
SC Tavriya Simferopol players
FC Metalurh Zaporizhzhia players
FC Karpaty Lviv players
FC Metalurh Donetsk players
Ukrainian Premier League players
Association football defenders
Ukrainian football managers
Ukrainian Premier League managers
FC Metalurh Zaporizhzhia managers
Association football midfielders
Sportspeople from Kherson Oblast